Giovanni Raicevich (10 June 1881 – 1 November 1957) was an Italian professional wrestler.

Career

He belonged to a family of champions of Greco-Roman wrestling, who were famous, but low-key; his brothers were Roberto Massimo and Emilio Ruggerio Raicevich. Giovanni Raicevich, began his activities by opening a gym in Trieste, aided by his brothers. In 1902 they traveled to Alexandria where all three became Italian champions in three different categories. Although they were from Austro Hungary they pursued their careers in Italy. After the First World War Trieste became part of Italy.

In 1905 he won the International Tournaments of Liège, of Krefeld and Westphalia in addition to the European Championship. In 1906 he won the South America championship. In 1907 he became world champion by beating the French champion Laurent le Beaucairois. He repeated the success on 16 February 1909 at the Teatro Dal Verme in Milan, against the French Paul Pons, one of the best wrestlers of all time. He was also champion of Italy in the specialty without interruption from 1907 to 1929 when he left the unbeaten competitive sport after his triumph against the Czech Hans Kavan.

Despite his height of only 1.72 meters (with a weight ranging from 82 kg in 1902 to 110 kg in the 1912), he fought against people who were of higher stature and was always the winner. His physical strength won him parts cinema chromatography in several films in the series Maciste, including L'uomo della foresta of 1922 directed by Roman director Ubaldo Maria Del Colle.

In 1915 during the First World War, he served in the Army and fought on the Italian side at Piave and Isonzo.

He spent his retirement living with the 5000 lire per month pension from CONI. He died in Rome, at the age of seventy-six, on 1 November 1957.

Awards
 Commander of 'Order of the Crown of Italy (1934)

See also
 Legends of Italian sport - Walk of Fame

Notes

References
Livio Toschi. Giovanni Raicevich : il re della forza : nella vita e sui tappeti di lotta si batte per Trieste italiana. Da: Rassegna storica del risorgimento, 90, 2003, n. 1, pp. 87–96. Istituto per la storia del risorgimento italiano, 2003.
Dino Cafagna. L’UOMO PIÙ FORTE DEL MONDO (LA LEGGENDA DI GIOVANNI RAICEVICH DA TRIESTE). L'unico libro (al mondo) completo sulla vita di Giovanni Raicevich, 200 pp., 180 fotografie a lui appartenute. Ed. Luglio, Trieste, 2015.

External links

1881 births
1957 deaths
Italian male professional wrestlers
People associated with physical culture
Professional wrestling trainers
Italian male actors
Sportspeople from Trieste
People from Austrian Littoral
Italian people of Serbian descent
Italian military personnel of World War I